Justin Mottier (born 14 September 1993) is a French former cyclist, who competed as a professional from 2018 to 2020 for .

Career

Amateur
In 2016, Mottier joined VC Pays de Loudéac, with the goal of eventually moving into the professional ranks. He was then selected to ride for the national team in the Grand Prix de Plumelec-Morbihan, where he placed 91st. In August, he was offered to ride for UCI Professional Continental team  as a stagiaire. While riding with the team, Mottier competed in the Tour of Utah and several one-day races in Belgium, including the Grote Prijs Jef Scherens. For the 2017 season, Mottier stayed with VC Pays de Loudéac, most notably placing second overall in the Tour de Normandie.

Professional
Mottier was one of two riders on the team from the Mayenne department, alongside Arnaud Courteille. His first race with the team was the Grand Prix La Marseillaisein late January. In early March, he placed third in the Route Adélie after remaining in the breakaway for 200 kilometers. Two weeks later, he entered his first World Tour events, taking part in the Amstel Gold Race followed by the La Flèche Wallonne.

Mottier had a less successful second season as a professional, with his best result being 18th in the Circuit de Wallonie. Despite this, he remained with the team for a third season in 2020. After falling ill and suffering a fractured collarbone while training in December 2019, Mottier only competed in three races before the Covid-19 pandemic, including the Tour de Langkawi. He returned to racing in August at the Mont Ventoux Dénivelé Challenge, followed by several more races throughout France. However, he lacked success once again and was this time not kept by his team.

In November 2020, it was announced that he would join French amateur team Laval Cyclisme 53, for the 2021 season.

Major results
Sources:

2011
 4th Tour du Morbihan Juniors
 10th Overall Le Trophée Centre Morbihan
2012
 10th Under-23 Chrono des Nations
2014
 1st Stage 3 
2015
 1st Grand Prix de Beaumont-sur-Sarthe
 1st GP de Mortagne au Perche
2017
 1st La Castelbriantaise
 1st 
 1st 
 1st GP Chapelle-Saint-Aubin
 1st Stage 1 Tour d'Eure-et-Loir
 9th Overall Boucle de l'Artois
1st Stage 1
2017
 1st Souvenir René Lochet
 1st Stage 3 
 2nd Overall Tour de Normandie
 3rd Paris–Évreux
2018
 1st Cyclo-cross de Vaiges
 3rd Route Adélie

References

External links

1993 births
Living people
French male cyclists
Sportspeople from Mayenne
Cyclists from Pays de la Loire
Cyclo-cross cyclists